Andrea Limper  (born 1 May 1966) is a German former footballer. She was a member of the Germany women's national football team from 1985 to 1987. On club level she played for KBC Duisburg.

References

External links
 Germany player profile
 Profile at soccerdonna.de

1966 births
Living people
German women's footballers
Place of birth missing (living people)
Germany women's international footballers
Women's association football midfielders